Mevlüt Çavuşoğlu (born 5 February 1968) is a Turkish diplomat and politician who has served as Minister of Foreign Affairs of Turkey since 24 November 2015.

He previously served in the same position from August 2014 to August 2015. He is a member of the Grand National Assembly of Turkey, where he represents Antalya Province. First elected to Parliament in the 2002 general election, he is a founding member of the Turkish Justice and Development Party (AKP). He was the president of the Parliamentary Assembly of the Council of Europe from 2010 to 2012.

Early life and education 
Çavuşoğlu was born at Alanya, Antalya Province, Turkey. He graduated from Ankara University Faculty of Political Science in 1988, where he studied international relations. He then received a masters in economics from Long Island University in New York State, and studied for his doctorate at Bilkent University in Ankara, Turkey.

He was a research fellow at the London School of Economics, where he was for a time president of the Turkish Society. Çavuşoğlu did not receive a PhD.

Career 
While serving in parliament, Çavuşoğlu has chaired the Committee on Migration, Refugees and Population. In November 2009, he met with the Foreign Minister of Russia, Sergey Lavrov, in the context of a report that the Assembly was preparing on the Soviet famine of 1932–1933.

Speaking at a news conference ahead of the Antalya Diplomacy Forum on June 18–20, 2021, Çavuşoğlu said that establishing stability in the southern Caucasus is crucial for the people of the region and would also bring prosperity.

On 11 June 2022, he expressed support for the enlargement of NATO and said that Russia and terrorism are the two most important threats faced by NATO.

On 12 September 2022, a series of clashes erupted between Armenian and Azerbaijani troops along the Armenia–Azerbaijan border, marking a major escalation in the 2021–2022 Armenia–Azerbaijan border crisis. Çavuşoğlu tweeted that "Armenia should cease its provocations and focus on peace negotiations and cooperation with Azerbaijan".

Council of Europe 

Çavuşoğlu joined the Parliamentary Assembly of the Council of Europe in 2003, and soon after was named the head of the Turkish delegation and a vice-president of the Assembly.

During the January 2010 session of the Assembly, Çavuşoğlu was nominated—and elected on 25 January 2010—to replace outgoing President Lluís Maria De Puig of Spain. In an October reshuffle, this was the reason given for why he did not receive extra responsibilities in Prime Minister Recep Tayyip Erdoğan's government. His candidacy for this post was supported by all of Turkey's main parties. He became president just months before Turkey took up the chairmanship of the Committee of Ministers of the Council of Europe (November 2010), and at the same time that there was a Turkish president of the Congress of the Council of Europe. In 2012, Çavuşoğlu was succeeded by France's Jean-Claude Mignon.

2014 Turkish local elections 
Çavuşoğlu was criticized by the Turkish newspaper Hürriyet because of his intervention in the municipality election in Antalya that took place on 30 March 2014. When the opposing party candidate Mustafa Akaydin of the Turkish Republican People's Party was ahead of the ruling party candidate, he visited the courthouse with his supporters and interrupted the counting process.

After his interruption, the counting of votes was stopped. It was claimed that the votes not already counted were from suburbs where the opposing party had more supporters.

2017 Rotterdam landing ban 

On 11 March 2017, Çavuşoğlu was banned from landing in Rotterdam, the Netherlands, after threats of Turkish sanctions if his visit to Rotterdam was impeded, made “the search for a reasonable solution impossible“.  Çavuşoğlu had planned to organize a large gathering to talk about the 2017 Turkish constitutional referendum, in which many Dutch-based émigrés can vote. However, his presence was claimed by the Dutch authorities to be a threat to public safety, and Çavuşoğlu was turned away, despite being the Turkish Foreign Minister.

Meanwhile, Turkish President Recep Tayyip Erdoğan called the Netherlands, "Nazi remnants" and "fascists," which Dutch Prime Minister Mark Rutte called "a crazy remark." Çavuşoğlu followed by defending Erdoğan's remark, and by saying that the Netherlands was the "capital of fascism".

2021 talks with Afghan leaders
In August 2021, Çavuşoğlu said that "Turkey was in talks with all parties in Afghanistan, including the Taliban", and "views positively the messages the Islamist militants have sent" since the fall of Kabul. The Ministry also said that the Turkish embassy in Kabul would continue to function and is not expected to close.

In October 2021, Çavuşoğlu met with the Afghan foreign minister Amir Khan Muttaqi in Ankara. He urged the international community to engage with Taliban officials.

Personal life
Çavuşoğlu is married, with one child. He speaks Turkish, English, German, and Japanese. He also studies the Russian language, only having spoken it publicly in limited settings, and described himself as being on "an intermediate level". His brother Hasan is the president of the Alanyaspor football club.

Honours and medals

See also
List of foreign ministers in 2017
List of current foreign ministers

References

External links

Council of Europe Profile (PDF)

|-

|-

1968 births
Ankara University Faculty of Political Sciences alumni
Bilkent University alumni
Deputies of Antalya
Government ministers of Turkey
Justice and Development Party (Turkey) politicians
Living people
Long Island University alumni
Members of the 26th Parliament of Turkey
Members of the 24th Parliament of Turkey
Members of the 23rd Parliament of Turkey
Members of the 22nd Parliament of Turkey
Ministers of European Union Affairs of Turkey
Ministers of Foreign Affairs of Turkey
Parliamentary Assembly of the Council of Europe
People from Alanya
Members of the 64th government of Turkey
Members of the 65th government of Turkey
Members of the 66th government of Turkey
Grand Cordons of the Order of the Rising Sun
Alumni of the London School of Economics
Recipients of Hilal-i-Pakistan
Recipients of the Order of Merit (Ukraine), 2nd class
Recipients of the Order of Merit (Ukraine), 3rd class